Fred Cairns (1857 Scotland – 1 April 1896, Johannesburg, South Africa) was a well-known British comedian and music hall artist of the Victorian age. He was attached to the Lupino troupe for several years, operating out of the Britannia Theatre, Hoxton, and toured the music halls of the country.

He died on 1 April 1896 in Johannesburg during a tour of South Africa by the company of Messrs Hyman and Alexander, playing both the Empire Palace of Varieties and Theatre Royal of Varieties. (The Era roundly criticised this situation for not having two companies.)

Songs
 "Blot Upon The Family Name"
 "A Funny Cuts"

Some sample billings

References

External links
 Sing Us One of The Old Songs - A Guide to Popular Song 1860–1920 by Michael Kilgarriff
 Short review of Fred Cairns at Royal Cambridge Hall of Varieties, London, Saturday, 29 September 1888

1857 births
1896 deaths
Music hall performers